Concord Community Schools is a public school district headquartered in Dunlap in Elkhart County, Indiana.

The district serves approximately 5,400 students in grades K-12 at seven buildings.

Schools
Concord High School 
Concord Junior High School 
Concord Intermediate School 
Concord East Side Elementary 
Concord Ox Bow Elementary 
Concord South Side Elementary 
Concord West Side Elementary

References

External links
 Concord Community Schools

Education in Elkhart County, Indiana
School districts in Indiana
Elkhart, Indiana